Etybenzatropine (INN), also known as ethybenztropine (USAN, BAN) and tropethydrylin, is an anticholinergic/antihistamine marketed under the trade names Panolid, Ponalid, and Ponalide, which is used as an antiparkinsonian agent. Like its analogue benzatropine, it may act as a dopamine reuptake inhibitor.

See also 
 Benzatropine

References 

Antiparkinsonian agents
Muscarinic antagonists
Tropanes
Diphenylmethanol ethers